In this period, members of the European Parliament were not directly elected, but were chosen by and from among the members of the House of Commons and House of Lords as delegates. The total size of the United Kingdom delegation was 36 but the Labour Party refused to name its delegates because of the party's then policy of opposing British membership of the European Communities. After the 1975 referendum, Labour decided to take its seats.



See also
 Members of the European Parliament

1973
List
United Kingdom